,  The Story of Tank Commander Nishizumi, is a 1940 Japanese war film directed by Kōzaburō Yoshimura. It is based on a true story of the Sino-Japanese war involving Japanese war hero Kojirō Nishizumi, commander in the First Tank Regiment. To make the film, Yoshimura toured the actual battlefields in China.

Cast
 Shin Saburi
 Ken Uehara
 Michiko Kuwano

Historical background

Following his death during the Battle of Xuzhou in 1938, Nishizumi was declared Japan’s first "gunshin", or War God. His career became the subject of legend and widespread praise throughout Japan, spawning numerous biographies, songs, and novels in his honor. The Legend of Tank Commander Nishizumi was promoted by the Japanese Ministry of the Army and the Ministry of Education upon its release in 1940.

Legacy
Cinema theorist Kate Taylor-Jones suggests that along with films like Mud and Soldiers and Chocolate and Soldiers, The Legend of Tank Commander Nishizumi offered "a vision of the noble, obedient and honourable Japanese army fighting to defend the Emperor and Japan."

References

Further reading
 
 

1940 films
Japanese war films
Japanese propaganda films
1940s Japanese-language films
1940s war films
Japanese black-and-white films